Spilosoma melanimon is a moth in the family Erebidae. It was described by Paul Mabille in 1880. It is found in Madagascar.

Description

Female
Head and thorax deep red brown; basal joint of antennæ orange; femora orange above; abdomen orange, with short dorsal black bands, the ventral surface red brown. Forewing deep red brown, with the costal edge orange. Hindwing fuscous black; the costal area orange yellow to near apex, emitting a small discoidal lunule; the inner margin and cilia yellow.

Wingspan 38 mm.

References

Spilosoma melanimon at Markku Savela's Lepidoptera and Some Other Life Forms

Moths described in 1880
melanimon